Pay-per-call (PPCall, also called cost-per-call) is an advertising model which allows companies to advertise on TV and literally pay for each call generated from each TV commercial aired based on a performance model and agreed upon cost per call. The Pay Per Call model allows companies to avoid expensive cash media spends for TV and radio, in favor of only paying for qualified calls. A Qualified Call is a pre-determined and agreed upon item and generally is measured in call length duration or obtaining a minimum number of data points from a call (i.e. Caller name, email, and phone number). Pay Per Call service providers has established networks to place media on TV nationally, locally, and regionally. Those seeking to advertise on TV using Pay-Per-Call strategies generally need to provide a deposit against future leads (a typical deposit is $15K to $20K for a national media buy). 

The popularity of Pay Per Call TV campaigns continues to grow. Typical TV commercials for this approach include legal torts and legal services, insurance and medical devices and services, and continue to expand to major brand marketers seeking new approaches to generating sales using cost-effective strategies. With the advancements of telephone call center reporting services, TV advertisers can measure calls in real-time, capture call data including telephone number and zip code, as well as record each call.

Pay Per Call TV advertising is not similar to online pay per click (PPC) advertising and induces the viewer to make a telephone call only instead of viewing an external website. Both enterprises looking to reach certain locations, or local/regional businesses can benefit from Pay Per Call campaigns, because it allows customers to talk with the seller before buying a product or service. Vendors of pay-per-call advertising attribute the growth of the model to the popularity of smartphones and claim that it reduces the costs of on-line click fraud.
 
Pay-per-call advertising is not to be confused with premium-rate telephone numbers. Pay-per-call is the inverse of a premium telephone number, in that the advertiser who receives the call, not the caller, is charged for the service. Since it is cost per lead advertising, the rates are higher than for toll-free telephone number service. In general, the advertiser is only billed for calls that last at least one minute.

The duration of interactions (since callers spend more time interacting with the business on the phone than looking at their website) and the probability of fraud through calls is significantly reduced are factors that might increase Pay Per Call pricing, but also increases its effectiveness.

Description

Merchants define their relevant key terms, choose desired categories and a geographic area for the ad to appear (local, regional or national). From there, they create their ad, containing their company name, address, a short description and a trackable toll-free telephone number of the PPCall provider, which redirects to the advertiser's actual phone number. This type of advertisement is popular with Yellow Pages companies.

Call-tracking software allows pay-per-call advertising providers to account for results. It is used to track, record, forward and account for every call. Calls can be automatically forwarded to the advertiser or sent to a call center where potential prospects are qualified before being passed along to advertisers. Average call durations are between 2 and 4 minutes.

Pay-per-call providers have higher rates than online pay-per-click providers, citing higher consumer intent to purchase and a higher conversion rate. Providers also report that captured call-data is more detailed and actionable than click-related data. PPCall extends beyond online advertising; it can be used in print, TV and outdoor advertising. It is available to businesses that do not have a website, because it routes prospective customers to a telephone number.

This allows business from all sizes to deliver highly targeted Pay Per Call campaigns that bring them qualified leads from online and offline sources.

PPCall has been boosted by click-to-call features on smartphones, which permit a user to call a number by tapping a link, without having to dial the number manually. Apple's Mac OS X Yosemite allows the same functionality on a desktop computer. Affiliate marketing networks have introduced PPCall in the UK.

References

Advertising techniques